Wang Zuxun (born May 1936) is a general in the People's Liberation Army of China.

He was a delegate to the 8th National People's Congress and a member of the Standing Committee of the 10th National People's Congress.

Biography
Wang was born in Qujing County (now Qujing), Yunnan, in May 1936. He enlisted in the People's Liberation Army (PLA) in June 1951, and joined the Chinese Communist Party (CCP) in 1959. He graduated from the PLA Military Academy.

He participated in the  during the Sino-Vietnamese War. In December 1993, he became vice president of the PLA Academy of Military Sciences, rising to president in January 1999.

He attained the rank of major general (shaojiang) in September 1988, lieutenant general (zhongjiang) in December 1993, and general (shangjiang) in June 2000.

References

1936 births
Living people
People from Qujing
People's Liberation Army generals from Yunnan
People's Republic of China politicians from Yunnan
Chinese Communist Party politicians from Yunnan
Delegates to the 8th National People's Congress
Members of the Standing Committee of the 10th National People's Congress